Seyf ol Din Rud (also Romanized as Seyf ol Dīn Rūd, Seyf ed Dīn Rūd, and Seyf od Dīn Rūd) is a village in Qaranqu Rural District, in the Central District of Hashtrud County, East Azerbaijan Province, Iran. At the 2006 census, its population was 117, in 23 families.

References 

Towns and villages in Hashtrud County